Teok Assembly constituency is one of the 126 assembly constituencies of Assam Legislative Assembly. Teok forms part of the Jorhat Lok Sabha constituency.

Members of Legislative Assembly 
 1952: Harinarayan Barua, Indian National Congress
 1957: Harinarayan Barua, Indian National Congress
 1962: Tilok Gogoi, Indian National Congress
 1967: Tilok Gogoi, Indian National Congress
 1972: Dulal Chandra Khound, Communist Party of India
 1978: Devananda Bora, Janata party
 1983: Tilok Gogoi, Indian National Congress
 1985: Lalit Chandra Rajkhowa, Independent
 1991: Renupoma Rajkhowa, Asom Gana Parishad
 1996: Renupoma Rajkhowa, Asom Gana Parishad
 2001: Membor Gogoi, Indian National Congress
 2006: Membor Gogoi, Indian National Congress
 2011: Membor Gogoi, Indian National Congress
 2016: Renupoma Rajkhowa, Asom Gana Parishad
 2021: Renupoma Rajkhowa, Asom Gana Parishad

Election results

2016 result

References

External links 
 

Assembly constituencies of Assam